The  is an arcade controller released by Namco in 1996 for the PlayStation.

Overview
The Arcade Stick functions similar towards the layout of a generic arcade stick found on an arcade game machine. It also features very similar components, manufactured by Hori. It is compatible with the original PlayStation control pad protocol, therefore it can be used with many games for PlayStation and PlayStation 2. Namco PlayStation games such as Tekken, Soul Edge and Namco Museum Encore are labelled as compatible with the peripheral. It is also compatible with the PlayStation 3 upon use of a PS2 to PC USB adapter. Functionality was expanded on the PlayStation 3 upon the 2.0 firmware update. It is fully compatible with PlayStation 3 fighting games such as Ultimate Marvel vs. Capcom 3, Tekken Tag Tournament 2, and Super Street Fighter IV.

Notes

References

Game controllers
PlayStation (console) accessories
Namco